Abara (Japanese: アバラ, stylized as ABARA, lit. Ribs) is a Japanese manga series written and illustrated by Tsutomu Nihei. It was serialized in Shueisha's seinen manga magazine Ultra Jump from May 19, 2005, to March 18, 2006, with its chapters collected in two tankōbon volumes. 

Set in a dystopian world filled with large structures, the story revolves around creatures known as Gaunas who can shape bone-like armor and weaponry around themselves. The story focuses on one such Gauna known as Kudou Denji.

It is licensed for French release by Glénat, Polish by JPF and English by Viz Media.

Plot

Sometime in the future, humans have destroyed Earth's environment and are forced to live in cities connected only by a single highway and many tubes. However, some humans have mutated and become White Gaunas, a species which poses a threat to mankind. A group of scientists foresaw this dystopian situation years before. In an attempt to preserve humanity's future, they produced a number of time machines powered by nuclear plants called mausoleums. Each time machine can send humans to a distant future, thus ensuring the survival of the human race. They also use the collective energy from these plants to shift all White Gaunas on Earth at the time to a separate dimension. The scientists eventually entrust knowledge of all this to the 4th Eon Group (4th Chronicle Group), tasked to ensure at least a pair of humans can escape into the future.

However, White Gauna mutation is still prominent, and White Gaunas consume the remaining humans. People begin to fight over the time machines and the mausoleums in desperation. Due to all the chaos, all the mausoleums are destroyed except for one. The 4th Eon Group is wiped out, but not before they upload remnants of their memories and personalities onto the computers embedded in the Raven, the Skull Man, and the Stick.

Moreover, the Observation Bureau (Kagen House) is created to safeguard the true purpose of the Mausoleums so as to prevent further conflict.

Hundreds of years later, to counter the White Gaunas, the Observation Bureau study the White Gaunas and engineer a human-Gauna hybrid, known as Black Gaunas, which have the abilities of the White Gaunas yet retain their human minds. Two children, Denji and Nayuta, are used as test subjects. Nayuta is the first to be experimented upon, and a control device is implanted in her. However, before they could implant the other control device, Denji escapes, killing people in the process.

A few years later, Tadohomi engages Denji's help in eliminating the first White Gauna before more casualties occur. Denji complies but is wounded in the process. Sakijima tracks down Tadohomi and arrests her after Denji's body is found at the scene in the aftermath of the battle with the White Gauna. At this point, Sakijima is oblivious about the Observation Bureau's existence. Meanwhile, the Observation Bureau sends Nayuta as a Black Gauna to bring Denji back to HQ by taking advantage of Denji's wounded state. The boss of the Observation Bureau feels that Black Gaunas are untrustworthy; to him, Black Gaunas are monsters akin to their White cousins. Sakijima is ordered by his bosses in the Ministry to release Tadohomi. At this point, he starts becoming suspicious of the Observation Bureau and decides to dig up the truth.

Another White Gauna spawns, but this time it is able to consume humans before the Bureau takes action. At first, they sent a squad of humans, but when this failed, they sent Nayuta to destroy the big White Gauna. However, a humanoid White Gauna appears and duels with Nayuta. After a battle between the two, Nayuta wins the victory - a few seconds after fatally stabbing the White Gauna, Nayuta falls dead. Because she is telepathically linked with her twin Ayuta, any damage sustained by Nayuta is also manifested in Ayuta.

Meanwhile, the cop Sakijima gains information regarding the 4th Chronicle Group and the Gaunas from a colleague who was sent to talk with an old man who is in charge of the archives. With more information, Sakijima moves to Kegen Hall for a confrontation. His colleague is shot down by a Kegen Hall security guard whom Sakijima then kills. Sakijima meets Tadohomi who is attempting to rescue her childhood friend, Denji. just as she is about to get killed by a team of Kegen Hall guards, Sakijima helps her out and they both enter the room where Denji is being held. Then, a revived Ayuta awakes and mutates into a White Gauna. Denji fights Ayuta while Sakijima and Tadohomi flee on a helicopter. The successors to the 4th Chronicle Group's memories seek to activate a missile weapon they believe is capable of killing the Big White Gauna if it hits the spinal cord. Ayuta, now a White Gauna, attacks them and Denji fights her off, which the Raven and the Skull use as an advantage. When the missile is primed and the Big White Gauna is in sight, the Skull is still hanging onto the missile, trying to attach the hostless black Gauna to the projectile. Raven has no choice but to fire the missile along with him in hope of killing the Big White Gauna.

The missile hits and the Big White Gauna falls to his death. However, the nuclear reactor is beginning to fail, and the Forbidden Cage appears due to insufficient energy to dimensionally shift all White Gaunas. A White Gauna attacks the helicopter, which crashes. The Stick and the Raven guide Tadohomi and Sakijima to the House storing the time machine. The Raven is killed by Ayuta, but Nayuta appears in the nick of time and kills her sister. Tadohomi and Sakijima escape into the House just as an explosion seemingly destroys Nayuta. With the help of the Stick, the duo activate the time machine.

Many years later, the rest of humanity has been killed off either by the White Gaunas or by infighting. The world is an empty landscape, and lush greenery has taken over the House's rooms. Tadohomi and Sakijima run out of the House and look up into the sky.

Two Black Gaunas, revealed to be Denji and Nayuta, continue to battle with the White Gaunas, stranded in a separate dimension.

Reception 
The manga was nominated for an Eisner Award in the category "Best U.S. Edition of International Material—Asia" in 2019.

References

External links
 

2005 manga
Biorobotics in fiction
Genetic engineering in fiction
Seinen manga
Shueisha manga
Tsutomu Nihei
Viz Media manga